Thomas Alfred Butcher (born 29 June 1963) is an English actor. He was born in Stamford.

Biography

Acting career

Television
Butcher is best known for playing PC Steve Loxton in The Bill from 1990 to 1997 (with a one-off return in 1999), Marc Eliot in Doctors, Tim Gaskill in Casualty. He has also guest starred in Holby City, Peak Practice, Heartbeat, Bugs, The Mrs Bradley Mysteries, and Dangerfield.

Movie
Butcher portrayed the lead role of Mike in the urban horror thriller Cherry Tree Lane.

Personal life
Butcher is married to former Doctors and Emmerdale actress Corrinne Wicks.

References

External links
 

English male soap opera actors
1963 births
Living people